The blocking of Telegram in Russia  is the process of restricting access to Telegram messenger on the territory of the Russian Federation. The technical process of this restriction began on April 16, 2018. The blocking led to interruptions in the operation of many third-party services, but practically did not affect the availability of Telegram in Russia. It was officially unblocked on June 19, 2020.

Background
The Yarovaya law, which requires telecom operators to keep all voice and messaging traffic of their customers for half a year, and their internet traffic for 30 days, went into effect in the Russian Federation on July 1, 2018.

The position of Moscow's Meschansky district court is that, in accordance with the Yarovaya law, Telegram is required to store encryption keys from all user correspondence and provide them to Russia's Federal Security Service, the FSB, upon request. Telegram management insists that this requirement is technically impracticable, since keys of opt-in secret chats are stored on users' devices and are not in Telegram's possession. Pavel Durov, Telegram's co-founder, said that the FSB's demands violated the constitutional rights of Russian citizens to the privacy of correspondence.

On 13 April 2018 Moscow's Tagansky District Court has ruled, with immediate effect, on restricting access to Telegram in Russia
. Telegram's appeal to the Russian Supreme Court has been rejected.

In April 2020, the Government of Russia started using the blocked Telegram platform to spread information related to COVID-19 outbreak.

On 18 June 2020 Roskomnadzor lifted its ban on Telegram after it 'agrees to help with extremism investigations'. The court ruling which was the basis of original ban is still in force, and hence the lifting is illegal.

Courts and legal position of the parties
Conflict between the FSB and Telegram began earlier than the Yarovaya law came into effect. In September 2017, the FSB filed a lawsuit on the non-fulfillment of the Yarovaya law by Telegram. In October 2017, a judgment was delivered in favor of the FSB, imposing a fine on Telegram of 800 thousand rubles. The reason cited was the lack of encryption keys for 6 persons accused of terrorism. According to a statement issued by one of the founders of Telegram, Pavel Durov, even if the request of the FSB was solely intended to help in capturing six terrorists, Telegram could not comply, as the mobile numbers that the FSB was concerned with either never had accounts in Telegram, or their accounts were deleted due to inactivity. At the same time, the FSB had demanded the creation of a technology that would enable them to access the correspondence of any users.

According to Pavel Durov, the FSB's requirements were not feasible:

Pavel Durov put out a call on October 16, 2017, for lawyers who are willing to represent Telegram in a court to appeal the decision. Two days later Durov said that he received 200 proposals from lawyers, and chosen Inter-regional Association of Human Rights Organizations "Agora" to represent Telegram in the court battles.

Russia's Supreme Court rejected Telegram's lawsuit to FSB on March 20, 2018. After the court ruling, the Russian watchdog Roskomnadzor said the messaging service had 15 days to provide the required information to the country's security agencies. The FSB defended its position, saying that providing the FSB with the technical ability to decode messages does not annul legal procedures such as obtaining court rules in order to perlustrate specific messages.

On April 13, 2018, Moscow's Tagansky district court ruled to block access to Telegram in Russia over its failure to provide encryption keys to the FSB.

Blocks
Enforcement of the ban was attempted by blocking over 19 million IP addresses associated with the service. However they included those used by Amazon Web Services and Google Cloud Platform, due to Telegram's use of the providers to route messages using domain fronting. This led to unintended collateral damage due to usage of the platforms by other services in the country, including retail, Mastercard SecureCode, and Mail.ru's Tamtam messaging service. Users used VPNs to bypass the ban as a result. While many unrelated web services (such as banking websites and mobile apps) that used content from the Google and Amazon clouds were blocked, the government did not succeed in blocking Telegram.

On 17 April 2018, Russian authorities asked Apple and Google to pull the service from their stores as well as APKMirror, however Apple and Google refused the request. On 28 March 2018, Roskomnadzor reportedly sent a legally binding letter to Apple asking it to remove the app from the Russian version of its App Store and block it from sending push notifications to local users who have already downloaded the app. On 27 December 2018, the largest search engine in Russia, Yandex, removed telegram.org from their search results. On 18 June 2020, the Russian government lifted its ban on Telegram after it agreed to "help with extremism investigations".

Protest actions
On April 22, 2018, "an action in support of free Internet" was held in multiple cities around Russia, timed to the seventh day of Telegram's being blocked. Residents of Russia launched paper airplanes (the symbol of Telegram) from the roofs of various buildings. The protest was planned on Telegram on the morning of April 22. Pavel Durov, one of the founders of Telegram, supported the action, but asked that the participants gather up the paper airplanes within an hour after the launch. 

On April 30, 2018, in the center of Moscow, an action was held in support of Telegram in Russia as a result of its blocking. More than 12,000 people participated.

See also

 Blocking of Wikipedia in Russia
 Internet censorship
 Telegram in Iran

References

April 2018 events in Russia
Internet censorship in Russia
Telegram (software)